Mary Washington Hospital is a 451-bed, full-service hospital in Fredericksburg, Virginia. It is one of seven level II trauma centers in Virginia and was ranked 6th best in the state by U.S. News & World Report.

History
In 1942 the hospital was evacuated during the floods.

In 1978 it was investigated for violating the Hill Burton Act.

References

External links

Buildings and structures in Fredericksburg, Virginia
Hospitals in Virginia